The Women's 53 kg weightlifting event was the second-lightest women's event at the 2014 Commonwealth Games, limiting competitors to a maximum of  of body mass. The competition took place on 25 July and was the first weightlifting event to conclude. The event took place at the Clyde Auditorium.

The event was originally won by 16-year-old Chika Amalaha of Nigeria. Following a failed doping test, Amalaha was stripped of her medal and placement, and the medals were redistributed.

Result

References

Weightlifting at the 2014 Commonwealth Games
Common